Ai Georgis is a dance from the village of Nestani in Arkadia, a region of Greece in the Peloponnesus which takes its name from the mythological character Arcas. The dance is performed and danced on the feast day of St George usually after Easter Sunday.

Dance
The dance is accompanied only by song.  The men lead the dance and the women follow. Each of the male dancers holds a shepherds crook which has been entwined with green leaves and wildflowers. The hand holding the crook is bent at the elbows. The rhythm of the song is in 7/8 and in 2/4. 

The dance is  made up of ten basic steps broken into four parts. The lyrics are about St George protecting the villagers from the hands of the Ottomans and about Hagia Sophia.

See also
Greek music
Greek dances
Greek folk music
Nisiotika
Sousta
Ikariotikos
Ai Georgis- Greece on DanceAsk

References
Γιαννης ΠΡΑΝΤΣΙΔΗΣ, Ο χορός στην ελληνική παράδοση και η διδaσκαλια του
Yiannis PRANTZIDIS, Dance in Greek Tradition and its Teaching, EKDOTIKI AIGINION

Greek dances